Festuca matthewsii, also known as Matthew's fescue, is a species of grass in the family Poaceae. It is native to the South Island of New Zealand. It is perennial and mainly grows on subalpine or subarctic biomes. Festuca matthewsii was first described by Eduard Hackel in 1903 as Festuca ovina subsp. matthewsii,  and identified as a species by Thomas Cheeseman in the posthumously released second edition of the Manual of the New Zealand Flora in 1925.

Accepted Infraspecifics: 
 Festuca matthewsii subsp. aquilonia Connor
 Festuca matthewsii subsp. latifundii Connor
 Festuca matthewsii subsp. matthewsii
 Festuca matthewsii subsp. pisamontis Connor

References

matthewsii
Grasses of New Zealand
Endemic flora of New Zealand
Taxa named by Thomas Frederic Cheeseman
Taxa named by Eduard Hackel